The 2013–14 VTB United League was the 5th complete season of the VTB United League. The tournament featured 20 teams, from 10 countries during the season, 2 more teams than the previous year. It was the first season the VTB United League that functioned as the new domestic first tier level for Russian basketball clubs.

CSKA Moscow won their 5th VTB United League title, and their 21st Russian national championship.

Participants

Regular season

Group A

|}

Group B

|}

Playoffs

Bracket

Awards

Major awards
Most Valuable Player:  Andrew Goudelock (UNICS Kazan)
Playoffs MVP:  Miloš Teodosić (CSKA Moscow)
Coach of the Year:  Rimas Kurtinaitis (Khimki)
Sixth Man of the Year:  James Augustine (Khimki)
Defensive Player of the Year:  Sasha Kaun (CSKA Moscow)
Young Player of the Year:  Dmitry Kulagin (Triump Lyubertsy) &  Edgaras Ulanovas (Neptūnas)

Nationality awards
For the second season in a row, awards were handed out to the best player by nationality.

Monthly MVP

Statistical leaders
Scoring:  Cory Higgins, Triumph Lyubertsy (21.5)
Rebounds:  Frank Elegar, Kalev/Cramo (8.4)
Assists:  Jerry Johnson, Astana (7.5)
Steals:  Cuthbert Victor, Krasny Oktyabr (1.9)
Blocks:  Shane Lawal, Astana (2.1)

References

External links 
  
  

2013–14
2013–14 in European basketball leagues
2013–14 in Russian basketball
2013–14 in Lithuanian basketball
2013–14 in Ukrainian basketball
2013–14 in Latvian basketball
2013–14 in Estonian basketball
2013–14 in Polish basketball
2013–14 in Belarusian basketball
2013–14 in Kazakhstani basketball
2013–14 in Czech basketball